The Wilmslow Half Marathon is an annual half marathon road running race, established in 1984 and usually run in March as part of the Wilmslow Running Festival.

Course

The race starts to the west of Wilmslow, Cheshire and to the south of Manchester Airport. The course is a single loop and runs through the villages of Morley, Cheshire and Mobberley, finishing near the start. It uses country lanes, which are closed to traffic. It has been described as a 'beautiful Cheshire countryside course that is both fast and flat - a PB course!'

The course was remeasured in 2016 as the same measuring equipment had been used that incorrectly measured the Greater Manchester Marathon.

In 2019, the Wilmslow Half Marathon became part of 'Wilmslow Running Festival' and also included a 10k and Fun Run race.

Incidents

The 2018 edition of the event had to be cancelled due to bad weather. It was rearranged to June.

Recent winners
Key:

References

Half marathons in the United Kingdom
March events
Recurring sporting events established in 1984
1984 establishments in the United Kingdom
Annual sporting events in the United Kingdom
Wilmslow
Sport in Cheshire